Tukan may refer to:
 ProFe D-10 Tukan, a glider
 Tukan, Iran, a village in Kermanshah Province, Iran